= The Bohee Brothers =

Canadian musical duo

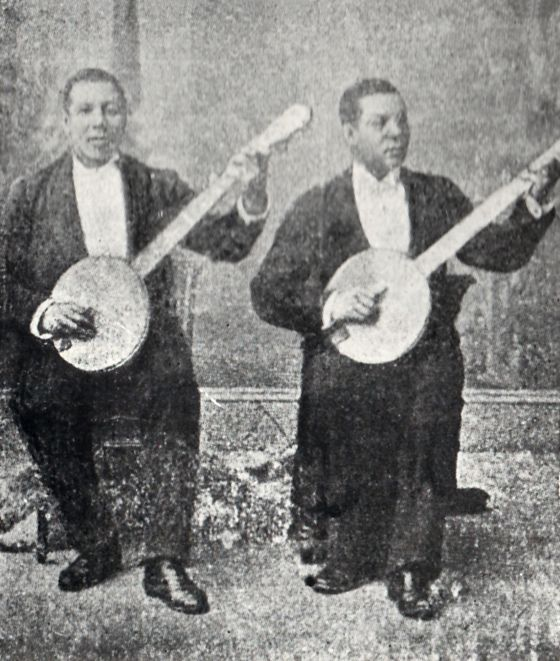
- James Bohee (left) and George Bohee (right)

Background information
- Origin: Indiantown (now Saint John) New Brunswick, Canada
- Instrument: Banjo
- Years active: 1876–1897
- Members: James Bohee; George Bohee

The Bohee Brothers were a Canadian musical duo that consisted of James Bohee (1844–1897) and George Bohee (1857–1930). They were banjo players of Caribbean descent. Their performance was popular because "they played and danced at the same time". "They also wrote their own material, and their songs were widely copied".

== History ==
The brothers were born in Indiantown, New Brunswick, Canada. Their family later moved to Boston, USA where James began his musical career playing banjo in the late 1860s. They organized their own Bohee Minstrels around 1876 which later joined a few other minstrels. The company toured the United States of America until they moved to England in 1881. The company eventually returned to the United States but the Bohee Brothers stayed in London and continued to tour and perform regularly in Europe until James' death.

In addition to performing, they ran a banjo teaching studio. James gave lessons to the Prince of Wales.

James Bohee is buried in an unmarked grave in the Great Circle of Brompton Cemetery.
